Ramaswami Pillai (1798–1852) was an Indian composer.  He was born in Tiruvarur to Kamala Tyagesam Pillai and Vasantammal, a family of Nayinar Adiyar associated with the Tyagesa temple at Tiruvarur. Ramaswami Pillai blossomed into a composer and a Penta linguist and retired to Vaidheeswaran Koil where he spent the last days of his life. He lived up to the age of 53. His sister Saraswati was also an accomplished musician who played the veena and a vocalist.

Ramaswami Pillai has around 52 compositions to his credit including varnas an kritis and his mudra was Vedapuri or Vedapureesa after one of the names of Vaidhisvaran koil. Some of his compositions include:
 Vanita ninne – Bhairavi
 Jagadisvarai – Mohanam
 Ekkalattilum – Purvikalyani
 Na meeda – Saurashtra
 Kamakshi Katakshi – Vasanta

References

 Mangala Isai Mannargal – B.M. Sundaram
 

Indian male composers